is a district located in Okhotsk Subprefecture, Hokkaido, Japan.

As of 2005, the district has an estimated population of 16,291 and a population density of 15 persons per km2. The total area is 1,123.42 km2.

Towns and villages
Kunneppu
Oketo
Saroma

History
In 1869, when Hokkaido was divided into provinces and districts, Tokoro was placed in Kitami Province.
June 10, 1942 Notsukeushi Town becomes a City with the new name of Kitami, separating it from the district.
November 15, 1950 Part of Shimoyuubetsu Village incorporated into Saroma Village (now Town)
September 30, 1956 Aiuchi Village incorporated into Kitami, leaving the district.
On March 5, 2006, the towns of Rubeshibe, Tanno and Tokoro were merged into the city of Kitami.

Districts in Hokkaido